UFC on Fox: Lee vs. Iaquinta 2 (also known as UFC on Fox 31) was a mixed martial arts event produced by the Ultimate Fighting Championship that was held on December 15, 2018 at Fiserv Forum in Milwaukee, Wisconsin, United States.

Background 
After previously contesting two events (UFC Live: Hardy vs. Lytle and UFC 164) in Milwaukee at Bradley Center, the event was the first for the promotion at the newly built venue.

The event also marked the end of the UFC's seven years with Fox as a new broadcast deal with ESPN is slated to begin in January 2019. It was also the last UFC event to air on network television until UFC on ABC: Holloway vs. Kattar in January 2021.

A lightweight rematch between former interim title challenger Kevin Lee and Al Iaquinta served as the event headliner. The pairing met previously in February 2014 at UFC 169 with Iaquinta winning the fight via unanimous decision.

Erik Koch was expected to face promotional newcomer Dwight Grant in a welterweight bout. However, Koch was removed from the card on November 28 for undisclosed reasons and replaced by Zak Ottow.

A women's flyweight bout between Jessica-Rose Clark and Andrea Lee was expected to take place at the event. However, Clark was forced out of the bout on weigh-in day as she was hospitalized due to a weight cutting issue and deemed medically unfit to compete by UFC physicians. As a result, the bout was cancelled.

Results

Bonus awards
The following fighters received $50,000 bonuses:
Fight of the Night: Joaquim Silva vs. Jared Gordon
Performance of the Night: Al Iaquinta and Charles Oliveira

Reported payout
The following is the reported payout to the fighters as reported to the Wisconsin's Department of Safety and Professional Services. It does not include sponsor money or "locker room" bonuses often given by the UFC and also do not include the UFC's traditional "fight night" bonuses. The total disclosed payout for the event was $1,216,000.

Al Iaquinta: $138,000 ($69,000 win bonus) def. Kevin Lee: $84,000
Edson Barboza: $100,000 ($50,000 win bonus) def. Dan Hooker: $75,000
Rob Font: $92,000 ($46,000 win bonus) def. Sergio Pettis: $33,000
Charles Oliveira: $180,000 ($90,000 win bonus) def. Jim Miller: $68,000
Zak Ottow: $20,000 ($10,000 win bonus) def. Dwight Grant: $21,000
Drakkar Klose: $72,000 ($36,000 win bonus) def. Bobby Green: $25,000
Joaquim Silva: $28,000 ($14,000 win bonus) def. Jared Gordon: $16,000
Jack Hermansson: $42,000 ($21,000 win bonus) def. Gerald Meerschaert: $35,000
Zak Cummings: $58,000 ($29,000 win bonus) def. Trevor Smith: $29,000
Dan Ige: $20,000 ($10,000 win bonus) def. Jordan Griffin: $12,000
Mike Rodríguez: $24,000 ($12,000 win bonus) def. Adam Milstead: $10,000
Juan Adams: $24,000 ($12,000 win bonus) def. Chris De La Rocha: $10,000

See also 
 List of UFC events
 2018 in UFC
 List of current UFC fighters

References 

Fox UFC
2018 in mixed martial arts
Sports competitions in Milwaukee
December 2018 sports events in the United States
Events in Milwaukee